Nicolae Lupan (16 March 1921 – 25 January 2017) was a Bessarabian journalist.

Biography 

In 1958, Lupan became the first editor in chief of TeleRadio-Moldova. He was a member of the National Patriotic Front and lost his job. In March 1974, Lupan went into exile in Belgium. In exile he worked for Radio Free Europe (1974–1987).

Lupan was the president of the Pro-Bessarabia and Bukovina Association. The association was formed in Paris on 27 November 1950 by Nicolae Dianu and reactivated by Lupan in 1975.

Works 
 Nicolae Lupan, Plânsul Basarabiei, 1981, Carpatii, Madrid
 Nicolae Lupan, "Bessarabie, terre roumaine", 1982
 Nicolae Lupan, Pământuri româneşti : Schiţe, studii şi versuri, Brussels 1984.
 Nicolae Lupan, "Basarabia si Bucovina sunt Pãmânturi Românesti", Ed. Nistru, Brussels 1984.
 Nicolae Lupan, Scrisoare fratelui meu, Editura Nistru, Brussels, 1984, 156 pp.
 Nicolae Lupan, "Imagini nistrene", 2 volumes, 1986, 1990
 Nicolae Lupan, "Alexandru Cristescu, erou si martir", 1987
 Nicolae Lupan, Pământul Basarabiei. Brussels, 1989.
 Nicolae Lupan, Însemnări de desţărat. Brussels, 2001
 Nicolae Lupan, Din coapsa Daciei si a Romei
 Nicolae Lupan, Strain la mine acasa", 1996
 Nicolae Lupan, Gânduri de proscris

Bibliography 
 Janusz Bugajski, Ethnic Politics in Eastern Europe: A Guide to Nationality Policies, Organizations, and Parties, 1995.

Notes

1921 births
2017 deaths
Moldovan journalists
Male journalists
Moldovan anti-communists
Moldova State University alumni
Teleradio-Moldova
Radio Free Europe/Radio Liberty people
National Patriotic Front (Moldova) politicians
Soviet emigrants to Belgium